Phototrophs are organisms that carry out photon capture to produce complex organic compounds (e.g. carbohydrates) and acquire energy. They use the energy from light to carry out various cellular metabolic processes. It is a common misconception that phototrophs are obligatorily photosynthetic. Many, but not all, phototrophs often photosynthesize: they anabolically convert carbon dioxide into organic material to be utilized structurally, functionally, or as a source for later catabolic processes (e.g. in the form of starches, sugars and fats). All phototrophs either use electron transport chains or direct proton pumping to establish an electrochemical gradient which is utilized by ATP synthase, to provide the molecular energy currency for the cell. Phototrophs can be either autotrophs or heterotrophs. If their electron and hydrogen donors are inorganic compounds (e.g. Examples of phototroph organisms are Rhodobacter capsulatus, Chromatium, and Chlorobium.

History
Originally used with a different meaning, the term took its current definition after Lwoff and collaborators (1946).

Photoautotroph

Most of the well-recognized phototrophs are autotrophic, also known as photoautotrophs, and can fix carbon. They can be contrasted with chemotrophs that obtain their energy by the oxidation of electron donors in their environments. Photoautotrophs are capable of synthesizing their own food from inorganic substances using light as an energy source. Green plants and photosynthetic bacteria are photoautotrophs. Photoautotrophic organisms are sometimes referred to as holophytic. Such organisms derive their energy for food synthesis from light and are capable of using carbon dioxide as their principal source of carbon.

Oxygenic photosynthetic organisms use chlorophyll for light-energy capture and oxidize water, "splitting" it into molecular oxygen.  In contrast, anoxygenic photosynthetic bacteria have a substance called bacteriochlorophyll – which absorbs predominantly at non-optical wavelengths – for light-energy capture, live in aquatic environments, and will, using light, oxidize chemical substances such as hydrogen sulfide rather than water.

Ecology
In an ecological context, phototrophs are often the food source for neighboring heterotrophic life. In terrestrial environments, plants are the predominant variety, while aquatic environments include a range of phototrophic organisms such as algae (e.g., kelp), other protists (such as euglena), phytoplankton, and bacteria (such as cyanobacteria). The depth to which sunlight or artificial light can penetrate into water, so that photosynthesis may occur, is known as the photic zone.

Cyanobacteria, which are prokaryotic organisms which carry out oxygenic photosynthesis, occupy many environmental conditions, including fresh water, seas, soil, and lichen. Cyanobacteria carry out plant-like photosynthesis because the organelle in plants that carries out photosynthesis is derived from an endosymbiotic cyanobacterium. This bacterium can use water as a source of electrons in order to perform CO2  reduction reactions. Evolutionarily, cyanobacteria's ability to survive in oxygenic conditions, which are considered toxic to most anaerobic bacteria, might have given the bacteria an adaptive advantage which could have allowed the cyanobacteria to populate more efficiently.

A photolithoautotroph is an autotrophic organism that uses light energy, and an inorganic electron donor (e.g., H2O, H2, H2S), and CO2 as its carbon source. Examples include plants.

Photoheterotroph

In contrast to photoautotrophs, photoheterotrophs are organisms that depend solely on light for their energy and principally on organic compounds for their carbon. Photoheterotrophs produce ATP through photophosphorylation but use environmentally obtained organic compounds to build structures and other bio-molecules.

Classification by light-capturing molecule 
Most phototrophs use chlorophyll or the related bacteriochlorophyll to capture light and are known as chlorophototrophs. Others, however, use retinal and are retinalophototrophs.

Flowchart

See also
Primary nutritional groups
Prototroph

References 

Photosynthesis
Trophic ecology
Microbial growth and nutrition
Biology terminology